High Bray is a village, church of England parish and former civil parish in Devon, England, in the United Kingdom. In 1961 the civil parish had a population of 150. High Bray is now the civil parish of Brayford, in the North Devon district.

Wildlife filmmaker Johnny Kingdom was born and grew up in the village.

References

Villages in Devon
Former civil parishes in Devon
North Devon